Scott P. Abell (born December 5, 1969) is an American football coach and former minor league baseball player. He is currently the head football coach at Davidson College in Davidson, North Carolina.  Abell previously served as the head football coach at Washington & Lee University in Lexington, Virginia from 2012 to 2017. Drafted by the Kansas City Royals in 1992, he played for one year in the Royals farm system until focusing on a career in coaching.

Head coaching record

College

References

External links
 Davidson profile

1969 births
Living people
Baseball catchers
Baseball third basemen
Appleton Foxes players
Davidson Wildcats football coaches
Eugene Emeralds players
Longwood Lancers baseball players
Washington and Lee Generals football coaches
High school football coaches in Virginia